Gârliciu is a commune in Constanța County, Northern Dobruja, Romania, containing the village with the same name.

Demographics
At the 2011 census, Gârliciu had 1,511 Romanians. No other ethnicities were recorded.

References

Communes in Constanța County
Localities in Northern Dobruja